Mohammad Obaid Kamal (born 4 September 1972) is an Indian former first-class cricketer who played for Uttar Pradesh and Punjab. He became a coach and worked as a selector for Uttar Pradesh Cricket Association (UPCA) after his playing career.

Career
A right-arm medium-fast swing bowler, Kamal made his first-class debut for Uttar Pradesh at the age of 18 in the 1990–91 season. He finished as the third-highest wicket-taker of the 1992–93 Ranji Trophy (highest among pace bowlers) with 43 scalps at a sub-20 average. He played for Rest of India in the Irani Cup in 1993–94 at the age of 21 and switched to Punjab later that season. He soon became the first-choice new ball bowler of the zonal team and Rest of India. He returned to Uttar Pradesh after a three-season stint with Punjab, and formed a new ball pair with Ashish Zaidi. He represented India Youth XI and India A, but failed to gain selection for the national team. He played his last first-class match in November 1999 at the age of 27, and was regarded as "one of the best fast bowlers to never play for India".

Kamal became a member of the UPCA senior team selection committee in 2006. He was replaced by Rahul Sapru at the position in 2010. Kamal also worked as a coach who trained cricketers in Lucknow.

References

External links 
 
 

1972 births
Living people
Indian cricketers
Uttar Pradesh cricketers
Punjab, India cricketers
North Zone cricketers
Central Zone cricketers
Cricketers from Allahabad
Indian cricket coaches